Bestiario del balón (raw translation: Ball fable collection) is a Colombian collective football weblog.

History and profile
Bestiario del balón started in September 2005. It was inspired on Argentine blog En una baldosa.

This blog consists in a recompilation of old and new material about Colombian "bad" footballers and related issues. It also features old press and television reports about Colombian football.

As of June 2014 Nicolas Samper is the editor of the blog.

References

External links
 Bestiario del balón
 Old Blogger.com weblog

2005 establishments in Colombia
Sports blogs
Colombian websites
Association football websites
Spanish-language websites